The 1974 Paris–Tours was the 68th edition of the Paris–Tours cycle race and was held on 29 September 1974. The race started in Tours and finished in Versailles. The race was won by Francesco Moser.

General classification

Notes

References

1974 in French sport
1974
1974 Super Prestige Pernod
September 1974 sports events in Europe